The Association of Vologne Valley communes (French: Communauté de communes de la Vallée de la Vologne) is a former administrative association of communes in the Vosges département of eastern France and in the region of Lorraine. It was created in December 2002. It was merged into the new Communauté de communes Bruyères - Vallons des Vosges in January 2014.

The association, which took its name from the valley of the river Vologne, had its administrative offices at Bruyères.

Composition 
The Communauté de communes comprised the following communes:

Beauménil
Bruyères
Champ-le-Duc
Charmois-devant-Bruyères
Cheniménil
Deycimont
Docelles
Faucompierre
Fays
Fiménil
Laval-sur-Vologne
Laveline-devant-Bruyères
Laveline-du-Houx
Lépanges-sur-Vologne
La Neuveville-devant-Lépanges
Prey
Le Roulier-devant-Bruyères
Xamontarupt

References

Vologne Valley